Holy Family is a Roman Catholic parish in Fairfield, Connecticut, part of the Diocese of Bridgeport.

History

The Parish was founded in 1938. The present Gothic Revival church was designed by noted church architect J. Gerald Phelan.

References

External links 
 Diocese of Bridgeport

Holy Family Church
Roman Catholic churches in Fairfield, Connecticut
1938 establishments in Connecticut